Johann Eduard Hari (born 21 January 1979) is a British-Swiss writer and journalist who wrote for The Independent before being disgraced for plagiarism and fabrication. In 2011, Hari was suspended from The Independent and later resigned, after admitting to plagiarism and fabrications dating back to 2001 and making malicious edits to the Wikipedia pages of journalists who had criticised his conduct. He has since written books on the topics of depression, the war on drugs, and the effect of technology on attention spans, which have attracted criticism for poorly evidenced claims, misrepresented sources, and bad citational practices.

Early life
Hari was born in Glasgow, Scotland to a Scottish mother and Swiss father, before his family relocated to London when he was an infant. Hari states he was physically abused in his childhood while his father was away and his mother was ill.

He attended The John Lyon School, an independent school affiliated with Harrow, and then Woodhouse College, a state sixth form in Finchley. Hari graduated from King's College, Cambridge in 2001 with a double first in social and political sciences.

Hari is gay. Before his history of fabrication was uncovered, he wrote an article claiming he had sex with men who were members of homophobic far-right and Islamist groups, stating that with drugs and "a lot of flattery" he "coaxed" a nineteen year old Muslim into "wild gay sex".

Early career
In 2000, Hari was joint winner of The Times Student News Journalist of the Year award for his work on the Cambridge student newspaper, Varsity. He was allegedly forced to leave Varsity as a result of unethical behaviour.

After university, he joined the New Statesman, where he worked between 2001 and 2003, and then wrote two columns a week for The Independent. At the 2003 Press Gazette Awards, he won Young Journalist of the Year. A play by Hari, Going Down in History, was performed at the Garage Theatre in Edinburgh, and his book God Save the Queen? was published by Icon Books in 2002.

In addition to being a columnist for The Independent, Hari's work also appeared in The Huffington Post, The New York Times, the Los Angeles Times, The New Republic, The Nation, Le Monde, El País, The Sydney Morning Herald, and Haaretz, and he reported from locations around the world, such as Congo and Venezuela. He appeared regularly as an arts critic on the BBC Two programme The Review Show and was a book critic for Slate. In 2009, he was named by The Daily Telegraph as one of the most influential people on the left in Britain.

2011 plagiarism, fabrication and misconduct scandal

Plagiarism
In June 2011, bloggers at Deterritorial Support Group, as well as Yahoo! Ireland editor Brian Whelan, asserted that Hari had plagiarised material published in other interviews and writings by his interview subjects. For example, a 2009 interview with Afghan women's rights activist Malalai Joya included quotations from her book Raising My Voice in a manner that made them appear as if spoken directly to Hari. Hari initially denied any wrongdoing, stating that the unattributed quotes were for clarification and did not present someone else's thoughts as his own. However, he later said that his behaviour was "completely wrong" and that "when I interviewed people, I often presented things that had been said to other journalists or had been written in books as if they had been said to me, which was not truthful". Hari was suspended for two months from The Independent and in January 2012, it was announced he was leaving the newspaper.

The Media Standards Trust instructed the Council of the Orwell Prize, who had given their 2008 prize to Hari, to examine the allegations. The Council concluded that "the article contained inaccuracies and conflated different parts of someone else's story" and did not meet the standards of Orwell Prize-winning journalism. Hari returned the prize, though he did not return the prize money of £2,000. He later offered to repay the sum, but Political Quarterly, which had paid the prize money, instead invited him to make a donation to English PEN, of which George Orwell had been a member. Hari arranged with English PEN to make a donation equal to the value of the prize, to be paid in instalments when he returned to work at The Independent, but he did not return to work there.

Fabrication
In addition to plagiarism, Hari was found to have fabricated elements of stories. In one of the stories for which he won the Orwell Prize, he reported on atrocities in the Central African Republic, claiming that French soldiers told him that "Children would bring us the severed heads of their parents and scream for help, but our orders were not to help them." However, an NGO worker who translated for Hari said that the quotation was invented and that Hari exaggerated the extent of the devastation in the CAR. In his apology after his plagiarism was exposed, Hari claimed that other staff of the NGO had supported his version of events.

In an article about military robots, Hari falsely claimed that the former Japanese Prime Minister Junichiro Koizumi was attacked by a factory robot and was nearly killed. Hari falsely claimed that a large globe erected for the Copenhagen climate summit was "covered with corporate logos" for McDonald's and Carlsberg, with "the Coke brand ... stamped over Africa". He was also reported to have invented an account of seeing a demonstrator die at the 2001 Genoa G8 summit, when he had, in fact, left in a taxi before the event. Private Eyes Hackwatch column also suggested that he pretended to have used the drug ecstasy and misrepresented a two-week package tour in Iraq as a one-month research visit, in order to bolster support for the Iraq war by claiming that Iraqi civilians he spoke to were in favour of an invasion.

While Hari was working at the New Statesman, the magazine's deputy editor, Cristina Odone, doubted the authenticity of quotations in a story he wrote. When she asked to see his notebooks, he stalled, then claimed to have lost them. Odone subsequently found that her Wikipedia entry had been altered by Hari's sock puppet account "David Rose" to falsely accuse her of homophobia and anti-Semitism.

Hari has been accused of misrepresenting writing by George Galloway, Eric Hobsbawm, Nick Cohen and Noam Chomsky.

Hari used the fake sock puppet identity David Rose to pretend to be a subeditor who was qualified in environmental science.

Misuse of Wikipedia
In September 2011, Hari admitted that he had edited articles on Wikipedia about himself and journalists with whom he had had disputes. Using a sock puppet account under the name "David Rose", he added false and defamatory claims to articles about journalists including Nick Cohen, Cristina Odone, Francis Wheen, Andrew Roberts, Niall Ferguson and Oliver Kamm, and edited the article about himself "to make him seem one of the essential writers of our times".

In July 2011, Cohen wrote about the suspicious Wikipedia editing in The Spectator, prompting the New Statesman journalist David Allen Green to publish a blog post collecting evidence. This led to an investigation by the Wikipedia community and "David Rose" was blocked from Wikipedia. Hari published an apology in The Independent, admitting that he had been "David Rose" and writing: "I edited the entries of people I had clashed with in ways that were juvenile or malicious: I called one of them anti-Semitic and homophobic, and the other a drunk. I am mortified to have done this, because it breaches the most basic ethical rule: don't do to others what you don't want them to do to you. I apologise to the latter group unreservedly and totally."

Incest erotica
The email address used for Hari's "David Rose" Wikipedia account was used to post an incest-themed erotic story entitled "How my little brother learned to be a whore" to the Nifty Erotic Stories Archive. Milo Yiannopoulos criticised the story as racist due to "multiple references to stereotypical black behaviours"..

Use of libel law to suppress criticism
Hari used threats of suing for libel to prevent critics revealing his misrepresentations. His critique of a Nick Cohen article, "What's Left: How Liberals Lost Their Way", was criticised by British bloggers for factual and interpretive errors. Hari used libel law against a blogger who wrote that "a reputation for making things up should spell career death", leading to the blogger removing the post in question.

Rehabilitation

Following Hari's disgrace, his former colleague Suzanne Moore invited him to stay with her family and advised him to give up journalism and take up a profession like teaching, but according to Moore, he was "rescued" by celebrity friends like Elton John and Russell Brand.

In January 2012, after leaving The Independent, Hari announced that he was writing a book on the war on drugs.

In January 2015, Hari was the subject of a piece in the Guardian by Decca Aitkenhead which was described in The Quietus as a "shocking soft-soap profile".

Later career

Chasing the Scream (2015)

Hari's book about drugs, Chasing the Scream: The First and Last Days of the War on Drugs was published in 2015. His 2015 TED Talk, entitled "Everything you think you know about addiction is wrong", has been viewed over 19 million times (as of 31 March 2022) and lays out the idea that most addictions are functional responses to experiences and a lack of healthy supportive relationships, rather than a simple biological need for a particular substance.

Due to the previous scandals, Hari put the audio of some interviews conducted for the book online. Writer Jeremy Duns criticised instances where quotes were inaccurately transcribed or misrepresented, stating that out of a sample of dozens of clips, "in almost all cases, words in quotes had been changed or omitted without being noted, often for no apparent purpose, but in several cases to subtly change the narrative."

In a review for New Matilda, Michael Brull expressed reservations about Hari's citational practices and highlighted contradictions between the book's narrative and a 2009 article by Hari. He concluded: "I think Hari has provided a useful overview of some of the fundamental issues worth considering. But they should be treated as the opening shots of a casual polemicist and populariser, rather than the measured verdict of an academic."

Lost Connections (2018)
In January 2018, Hari's book Lost Connections, which deals with depression and anxiety, was published, with Hari citing his childhood issues, career crisis, and experiences with antidepressants and psychotherapy as fuelling his curiosity in the subject. Kirkus Reviews praised the book. Psychiatrist Carmine Pariante criticised Hari's "extreme scepticism" of antidepressants as "wrong, unhelpful and even dangerous". The journalist Joe Muggs described the rehabilitation of Hari as "irresponsible and dangerous", describing the book as "a hodge-podge of other people's research put together into something that was by turns half-baked and half the story".

An excerpt published in The Observer was sharply criticised by neuroscientist and Guardian columnist Dean Burnett, who pointed out that Hari appeared to be reporting as his own discoveries material—such as the biopsychosocial model—that has been common knowledge for decades, and for misrepresenting the medical, psychiatric, and scientific establishments as "some shadowy monolithic organisation, in thrall to the drug industry". Burnett subsequently wrote that he had been pressured by friends of Hari's at The Guardian to offer Hari a pre-emptive right to reply and, after publication, to link to Hari's attempt at rebuttal.

The journalist Zoe Stavri criticised the book for a lack of citations for key claims like "between 65 and 80% of people on antidepressants are depressed again within a year", reliance on the work of a single researcher, treating research on a single class of antidepressants as if it applies to all antidepressants, and conflating stress and depression. The psychologist and science writer Stuart Ritchie criticised Hari for repeatedly making the claim that "between 65 and 80% of people on antidepressants are depressed again within a year" without a clear citation. He traced the source of the claim to a pop science book rather than a review of the scientific literature.

Stolen Focus (2022)
In January 2022, Hari published a book called Stolen Focus: Why You Can't Pay Attention, claiming that elements of modern lifestyles, including social media, are "destroying our ability to concentrate". The book received praise from celebrities including Hillary Clinton and Stephen Fry. The book debuted at number seven on The New York Times nonfiction best-seller list for the week ending 12 February 2022.

Scientists Stuart Ritchie and Dean Burnett both criticised the book for failing to cite strong evidence for the claim of shrinking attention spans, as well as presenting mainstream psychological concepts as niche ideas that Hari had discovered. Writer/broadcaster Matthew Sweet investigated some of the claims in the book and found that Hari had failed to cite the primary sources for some studies, and misrepresented the results of studies that suggested multitasking could have benefits in certain conditions.

Awards
 Student News Journalist of the Year by The Times, 2000
 Young Journalist of the Year at the British Press Awards, 2003
 Newspaper Journalist of the Year at Amnesty International Media Awards, 2007, for the article The Dark Side of Dubai
 Author of Story of the Year at the Environmental Press Awards, 2008
 Orwell Prize for political journalism, 2008 (withdrawn 2011)
 Journalist of the Year at the Stonewall Awards, 2009
 Cultural Commentator of the Year at the Comment Awards, 2009
 Newspaper Journalist of the Year at Amnesty International Media Awards, 2010, for the article Congo's tragedy: The War the World Forgot
 Martha Gellhorn Prize for Journalism, 2010

See also

 Journalism scandals

Books

References

External links

 
 Articles about Johann Hari in The Guardian
 Articles for The Independent

1979 births
Living people
Alumni of King's College, Cambridge
Anglo-Scots
British atheists
British male journalists
British republicans
British social democrats
British drug policy reform activists
British gay writers
Journalistic scandals
Journalistic hoaxes
British LGBT journalists
English LGBT writers
People involved in plagiarism controversies
HuffPost writers and columnists
The Independent people
Journalists from London
British social commentators
People educated at The John Lyon School
21st-century atheists
Scottish people of Swiss descent
Conflict-of-interest editing on Wikipedia